A goby is a small fish whose pelvic fins are fused to form a disc-shaped sucker.

Goby may also refer to:

 Goby (search engine), a travel ticket search engine
 Goby, Virginia, an unincorporated area in the United States
 Goby Lake, in Palau
 Goby Eberhardt (1852–1926), German violinist
 W. J. Gobrecht (born 1931), American football player and coach
 Goby, on the American/Canadian animated television series Bubble Guppies

See also 
 Gobi (disambiguation)